Dick Squire (31 December 1864 – 28 April 1922) was an English first-class cricketer, who played one match for Yorkshire County Cricket Club in 1893.

Born in Scholes, Cleckheaton, Yorkshire, England, Squire was a right-handed batsman.  He bagged a pair against the Marylebone Cricket Club (MCC) at Lord's and failed to take a wicket, at a cost of 25 runs, with his slow left arm orthodox spin.

Squire died in April 1922 in Scholes, Yorkshire.

References

External links
Cricinfo Profile
Cricket Archive Statistics

1864 births
1922 deaths
Yorkshire cricketers
People from Cleckheaton
English cricketers
Sportspeople from Yorkshire